Boniface (III) was the Count of Bologna and Margrave of Tuscany from about 1004 to his death, probably in 1011.

He was the son of Adalbert, Count of Bologna, and his wife Bertila. He succeeded his father in Bologna and was created margrave of Tuscany sometime before 1004. By 1007, he had founded the abbey of Fonte Taona. His son Hugh was made Duke of Spoleto.

1011 deaths
Margraves of Tuscany
Year of birth unknown
House of Boniface